Diogo Miguel Guedes Almeida  (born 30 March 1998), known as Diga,  is a Portuguese professional footballer who plays for C.D. Mafra as a right-back.

Club career

Feirense
Born in Santa Maria da Feira, Aveiro District, Diga started and finished his development at C.D. Feirense and also had a two-year youth spell at Lisbon-based Sporting CP. He made his professional debut with the first team of the former club on 11 November 2017, playing 90 minutes in a 2–1 away loss against Moreirense F.C. in the group stage of the Taça da Liga. His maiden Primeira Liga appearance took place late in the same month, when he started in the 3–1 defeat at S.C. Braga.

After being relegated in 2019, Diga spent a further three campaigns with the side in the Segunda Liga. He made 84 competitive appearances during his spell, failing to score.

Mafra
Diga signed a one-year contract with second-tier C.D. Mafra on 7 July 2022.

References

External links

1998 births
Living people
Sportspeople from Santa Maria da Feira
Portuguese footballers
Association football defenders
Primeira Liga players
Liga Portugal 2 players
C.D. Feirense players
C.D. Mafra players